The Phobos monolith is a large rock on the surface of Mars's moon Phobos. A monolith is a geological feature consisting of a single massive piece of rock. Monoliths also occur naturally on Earth, but it has been suggested that the Phobos monolith may be a piece of impact ejecta. The monolith is a bright object near Stickney crater, described as a "building sized" boulder, which casts a prominent shadow. It was discovered by Efrain Palermo, who did extensive surveys of Martian probe imagery, and later confirmed by Lan Fleming, an imaging sub-contractor at NASA Johnson Space Center. 

The general vicinity of the monolith is a proposed landing site by Optech and the Mars Institute, for a robotic mission to Phobos known as PRIME (Phobos Reconnaissance and International Mars Exploration). The PRIME mission would be composed of an orbiter and lander, and each would carry four instruments designed to study various aspects of Phobos' geology. At present, PRIME has not been funded and does not have a projected launch date. Former astronaut Buzz Aldrin has spoken about the Phobos monolith and his support for a mission to Phobos.

The object appears in Mars Global Surveyor images SPS252603 and SPS255103, dated 1998. The object is unrelated to another monolith located on the surface of Mars, which NASA noted as an example of a common surface feature in that region.

In fiction 
The Phobos monolith features in the science-fiction novel Blue Remembered Earth, wherein its surface has been entirely carved by visiting astronauts into the semblance of a wrecked spaceship.

See also

 Caves of Mars Project
 Cydonia (Mars)
 Libya Montes
 Mars Global Surveyor
 Mars monolith

References

External links

 USGS Mars Global Surveyor MOC Image 55103 - Browse Page Monolith Zoom
 Analysis in year 2000 by Lan Fleming of SPS252603 and SPS255103
Phobos in general
 Phobos Profile by NASA's Solar System Exploration
 HiRISE images of Phobos
 Spacecraft images of Phobos from nineplanets
 USGS Phobos nomenclature
 Asaph Hall and the Moons of Mars
 Flight around Phobos (movie)
 Animation of Phobos
 Mars Pareidolia
 Palermo's Phobos Anomalies

Natural monoliths
Phobos (moon)